Gisilia stagnans is a moth in the family Cosmopterigidae. It is found in Namibia and South Africa.

References

Moths described in 1921
Chrysopeleiinae
Moths of Africa
Insects of Namibia